Daphne Arthur (born in 1984, Caracas, Venezuela) is a contemporary artist. Her artwork focuses on a combination of painting, sculpture, drawing, and uses smoke, paint, clay, and collage.

Biography and education 
Daphne Arthur (b. 1984, Caracas, Venezuela) centers her practice on the experimentation and transformation of conventional materials and forms. Drawing from her background, the Afro-Venezuelan artist explores the roles history, memory, and mythology play in the transformation or deterioration of the collective imaginary of the Black diaspora. 

Arthur received her BFA in Painting and Drawing from the School of the Art Institute of Chicago in 2007, and an MFA from the Yale School of Art in 2009. In 2020, she presented a solo exhibition titled “In The Eye of The World,” curated by Julia Marsh at Cedar Crest College, Philadelphia. Other institutional solo exhibitions include RARE gallery in New York, UMass Boston, and Yoga Gallery in Chicago. 

Arthur’s work has also been featured in national and international group exhibitions including Aalto University in Finland, Honfleur Gallery, City College of NY, The Nathan Cummings Foundation, Laviolabank Gallery, Marvelli Gallery, Arena 1, California African American Museum, Land of Tomorrow, Mexic-Arte Museum, 59 Rivoli gallery in Paris and the Florence Biennale VIII in Italy. She is the recipient of the Anne Critz fellowship, The Ald Held Fellowship at the American Academy of Rome, and the Vermont Studio Center Fellowship. 

Her work can be found in the collections of the California African American Museum of Art, Mexic Arte Museum along with other private collections as The Wellington Management, the Desmarais collection, 21c Museum.

Teaching experience 
 2020-Present Brooklyn College
 2020-Present Tufts SMFA
 2018-Present, York College
 2018-2020, Montclair State University

Artworks

Paintings

AKA 2016 Ain't Killin' Anyone (2016) 
Medium: Painting, 38"x21" - oil on canvas

Varied, broken tones. Dull, flat colors. Yellow, black AKA gun placed in the center of the photo. Pink flowers surrounding the gun, with black lines representing the stems and outlining the flowers.

This oil painting by Arthur is an auctioned art piece created for Trayvon Martin, who was fatally shot in Sanford, Florida. Arthur created this in response to news of the gun that killed the 17 year-old being auctioned off, and planned on using the money for teen services.

Installations and sculptures

El Juego del Tra Tra (2009) 
Medium: Wall Piece, 53"x54.5"x31" - canvas, wax, latex, oil, paint, spray paint, wire mesh, fur, plastic, white cloth, nails

This art piece by Arthur stretches from the wall to the floor, there is a person stretching out or climbing out of the wall and reaching for the floor. The piece on the floor does not have a set shape. The overall color palette is overall flat colors and there are many different art mediums put together.

Arthur uses ideas of the human form's futility, impermanence, and ethereality as the embodiment of this art piece. According to the gallery of Young Latina Artists Exhibition, this art piece is meant to be "about life and its incapacity to exist without the consequence or existent of death and decay."

Smoke drawings

Catching Butterflies (2017) 
Medium: Painting, 51.75"x42" - smoke and pastel on paper

This smoke drawing illuminates a feeling of apocalyptic desolation through this piece, as the scene depicted includes blurred image of the tree stretching from the outside inside the building and the broken glass on the window. The blur of the smoke creates a haunting and abandoned feeling.

Publications

Illustrator 
In the year of 2017, Arthur illustrated the graphic novel and designed the set in The Bench, A Homeless Love Story. This is based on true stores and real people, by Robert Galinsky. The Bench explores the stories of homeless characters dealing with the breakout of AIDS in the 1980s. Arthur contributes with the graphic novel adaption and designed sets in multiple of the theatre productions.

Bibliography 
Zevitas, Steven T. (2017). Studio Visit, Volume 40. Korea: The Open Studios Press. p. 12.

Roulette, Tod (2013). Edge Art: Black Latino(a) Artists, An Inter-Caribbean Dialogue. Roulette Fine Art. pp. 5–6.

References

External links 
 Daphne Arthur's Website

Living people
1984 births
21st-century women artists
Venezuelan women artists
People from New York (state)